ʿUmar ibn al-Khaṭṭāb (c. 584 – 644), sometimes referred by Muslims as ʿUmar al-Fārūq ("the one who distinguishes between right and wrong") was from the Banu Adi clan of the Quraysh tribe. He was a companion of the Islamic prophet Muhammad and became the second Caliph (634 – 644) following the death of Abu Bakr, the first Caliph.

Many of Umar's relatives of the same generation were also Sahaba and his daughter Hafsa bint Umar was a Mother of the Believers. His sons were also important Sahaba.

Family tree

Descendants

See also 

Family tree of Abu Bakr
Family tree of Uthman
Family tree of Ali

References

External links
https://web.archive.org/web/20041223044704/http://www.answering-ansar.org/answers/umme_kulthum/en/chap5.php

Umar
Umar